Ozonium texanum var. parasiticum is an ascomycete fungus that is a plant pathogen of chickpeas and lentils.

See also 
 List of lentil diseases
 List of chickpea diseases

References

External links 
 Index Fungorum
 USDA ARS Fungal Database

Fungal plant pathogens and diseases
Pulse crop diseases
Ascomycota enigmatic taxa